Gabriel Alejandro Arias (born February 27, 2000) is a Venezuelan professional baseball shortstop for the Cleveland Guardians of Major League Baseball (MLB). He made his MLB debut in 2022.

Career

Arias signed with the San Diego Padres as an international free agent in July 2016. He played his first professional season in 2017 with the Arizona League Padres and Fort Wayne TinCaps. After the season he played in the Australian Baseball League for the Canberra Cavalry. Arias played 2018 with the Fort Wayne and 2019 with the Lake Elsinore Storm. In 2020, he was invited to spring training with the Padres.

On August 31, 2020, the Padres traded Arias, Austin Hedges, Josh Naylor, Cal Quantrill, Owen Miller, and Joey Cantillo to the Cleveland Indians for Mike Clevinger, Greg Allen, and Matt Waldron. The Indians selected Arias' contract on November 20, 2020, adding him to their 40-man roster. He spent the 2021 season with the Triple-A Columbus Clippers. After beginning the 2022 season with Columbus, Arias was recalled by the Cleveland Guardians as the 29th man for their April 20, 2022 doubleheader against the Chicago White Sox. Arias made his major league debut in game 1 of the April 20, 2022 doubleheader, starting at second base.

References

External links

2000 births
Living people
Arizona League Padres players
Canberra Cavalry players
Cleveland Guardians players
Columbus Clippers players
Fort Wayne TinCaps players
Lake Elsinore Storm players
Major League Baseball players from Venezuela
Major League Baseball shortstops
People from Aragua
Tiburones de La Guaira players
Venezuelan expatriate baseball players in the United States
Venezuelan expatriate baseball players in Australia